South Korean boy band Day6 held their debut concert "D-Day" on November 21–22, 2015. They held 30 concerts during the Every Day6 project as they performed two to three times a month in Seoul in 2017. It includes the Finale Concert "The Best Moments" and four shows in Busan, Daegu and Daejeon which took place in early 2018. They completed their first world tour in January 2019: in seven months, they performed in 16 countries and 24 cities. They went on their first Japan tour in October 2018.

Tours

Day6 First World Tour "Youth" (2018-2019)

Day6 Second Live Tour in Japan (2018)

Day6 Second World Tour "Gravity" (2019-2020)

Concerts

Live concerts

Day6 Live Concert "D-Day" (2015)

Day6 Live Concert "Dream" (2016)

Day6 First Live in Japan "The Best Day" (2018)

Every Day6 Concerts (2017-2018)

Every Day6 Finale Concert "The Best Moments" (2018)

Day6 Christmas Special Concert "The Present" (2018)

Day6 Christmas Special Concert "The Present" (2019)

Others

Showcases

Fan Meetings

Day6 First Fan Meeting in Singapore

Day6 Fan Meeting in Singapore "Daydream"

Day6 First Fan Meeting "You Made My Day"

Day6 Second Fan Meeting "You Made My Day" Ep.2 [Scentographer]

Live & Meets

References 

Lists of concert tours
Lists of concert tours of South Korean artists
Lists of events in South Korea
South Korean music-related lists